The districts of Ivory Coast are the first-level administrative subdivisions of the country. The districts were created in 2011  in an effort to further decentralise the state.

There are 14 autonomous districts.  Except for the two autonomous districts around the cities of Yamoussoukro and Abidjan, the remaining 12 autonomous districts are further subdivided into 31 regions, which are further subdivided into 108 third-level subdivisions, the departments. Departments are subdivided into 510 sub-prefectures. The lowest level of administrative organisation, which exist in limited numbers, is the commune. Although they are not divided into regions, the autonomous districts of Abidjan and Yamoussoukro do contain departments, sub-prefectures, and communes.

Governance and purpose
Each district is headed by a governor, who is appointed by the council of ministers (cabinet) of the national government.

Districts have been given four primary responsibilities:
to administer major development projects in the district;
to balance the application of state investments and programmes throughout the district in order to minimise regional disparities;
to promote the economic and cultural potentials of large groups; and
to combat regionalism.

List of districts

The following is the list of districts, district capitals and each district's regions

2011 administrative subdivision changes 

Prior to September 2011, Ivory Coast's first-level administrative subdivisions were 19 regions. In 2011, the regions were reorganized into the 14 districts (12 regular districts and 2 autonomous districts). Then in 2021, all districts were made autonomous. The following is a summary of how the districts were constructed from the former regions:

 The largest city, Abidjan, and the political capital, Yamoussoukro, and their surrounding areas were split to form autonomous districts. Abidjan was formerly part of Lagunes Region and Yamoussoukro was formerly part of Lacs Region.
 Of the 19 regions, the northern regions of Denguélé, Savanes, Vallée du Bandama, and Zanzan were re-designated as districts with no change in territory. 
 The old Agnéby region and what remained of Lagunes Region were merged to form the new Lagunes District.
 The old Bafing and Worodougou Regions were merged to form the new Woroba District.
 The Department of Fresco was transferred from the former Sud-Bandama Region to the Bas-Sassandra Region to form the new Bas-Sassandra District, while the remainder of Sud-Bandama Region merged with Fromager Region to form the new Gôh-Djiboua District.
 The old Dix-Huit Montagnes and Moyen-Cavally Regions merged to form the new Montagnes District.
 The old Haut-Sassandra and Marahoué Regions merged to form the new Sassandra-Marahoué District.
 The old N'Zi-Comoé Region and what remained of Lacs Region were merged to form the new Lacs District.
 The old Moyen-Comoé and Sud-Comoé Regions were merged to form the new Comoé District.

See also
 ISO 3166-2:CI Districts of the Ivory Coast

References

 Carte du nouveau découpage administratif de la Côte-d'Ivoire (novembre 2011).

 
Subdivisions of Ivory Coast
Ivory Coast 1
Ivory Coast 1
Districts, Ivory Coast
Ivory Coast geography-related lists
States and territories established in 2011
2011 establishments in Ivory Coast